Jan Kohlhaase (1976) is a German mathematician specialising in the representation theory of p-adic Lie groups and arithmetic geometry.

Education and career 
From 1997 to 2002, Kohlhaase studied mathematics and physics at the University of Hamburg and at Purdue University. In 2005 he obtained his PhD at the University of Münster under the supervision of Peter Schneider. He subsequently worked at IHES, the University of Münster as well as the University of Heidelberg. Kohlhaase habilitated at the University of Münster in 2011, and was appointed professor for arithmetic geometry at the University of Duisburg-Essen in 2014.

References 

1976 births
Living people
20th-century German mathematicians
21st-century German mathematicians
Arithmetic geometers
Academic staff of the University of Duisburg-Essen
Place of birth missing (living people)
University of Münster alumni
University of Hamburg alumni